The 2021–22 Essex Senior Football League season was the 51st in the history of the Essex Senior Football League, a football competition in England.

The proposed constitution for this season was published on 22 May 2021, based on allocations for Steps 5 and 6 announced by the FA five days earlier, and it was subject to appeal. The constitution was ratified at the league's annual general meeting (AGM) on 24 June.

After the abandonment of the 2019–20 and 2020–21 seasons due to the COVID-19 pandemic in England, numerous promotions were decided on a points per game basis over the previous two seasons.

Essex Senior League
At the end of the 2020–21 season, the following teams left the league:
 Promoted to Step 4, to the Isthmian League North Division
 Hashtag United
 Transferred within Step 5, to the Spartan South Midlands League
 Hadley

The remaining 16 teams, together with the following, formed the Essex Senior League for 2021–22:
 Promoted from Step 6, from the Eastern Senior League
 Athletic Newham
 Little Oakley
 White Ensign
 Transferred within Step 5, from the Eastern Counties League
 FC Clacton
 Stanway Rovers

Cockfosters were initially moved to the Spartan South Midlands League, but they won their appeal and the transfer was reversed.

League table

Inter-step play-off

Results

Stadia and locations

References

2021-22
9